Worthy is the surname of:

Albert Worthy (1905–1978), English footballer 
Allan Worthy (born 1974), English cricketer
Calum Worthy (born 1991), Canadian actor, writer and producer best known for his role on Austin and Ally
Chandler Worthy (born 1993), Canadian football player
Chris Worthy (1947–2007), Canadian ice hockey player
Dave Worthy (1934–2004), Canadian politician
James Worthy (born 1961), American basketball player
Jerel Worthy (born 1990), American football player
Rick Worthy (born 1967), American actor
Trevor H. Worthy (born 1957), New Zealand paleozoologist
William Worthy (1921–2014), African-American journalist and civil rights activist
Xavier Worthy (born 2003), American football player